Elijah Albert Jones (January 27, 1882 – April 29, 1943), nicknamed "Bumpus", was an American baseball pitcher.  He was born in Oxford, Michigan, in 1882 and played seven years of professional baseball from 1906 to 1912, including two seasons in Major League Baseball with the Detroit Tigers in 1907 and 1909. He appeared in six major league games and compiled a 1-2 record with a 4.15 earned run average (ERA). He died in 1943 in Pontiac, Michigan, at age 61.

References

1882 births
1943 deaths
Detroit Tigers players
Major League Baseball pitchers
Baseball players from Michigan
Springfield Senators players
Johnstown Johnnies players
Montreal Royals players
Indianapolis Indians players
Jersey City Skeeters players
Rochester Hustlers players
People from Oxford, Michigan